A transpositional pun is a pun format with two aspects. It involves transposing the words in a well-known phrase or saying to get a daffynition-like clever redefinition of a well-known word unrelated to the original phrase. The redefinition is thus the first aspect, the transposition the second aspect. As a result, transpositional puns are considered among the most difficult to create, and commonly the most challenging to comprehend, particularly for non-native speakers of the language in which they're given (most commonly English).

Examples

See also
 Antimetabole
 Anti-proverb
 Chiasmus
 Russian reversal
 Spoonerism

References

Puns